Consort Xu (徐惠妃) ( 940 – 976) was a concubine of Later Shu's emperor Meng Chang during imperial China's Five Dynasties and Ten Kingdoms period. More commonly known as Madame Huarui (花蕊夫人), she was also a notable poet.

When Emperor Taizu of Song defeated Meng Cheng, Madame Huarui was captured. Emperor Taizu had heard of her fame as a poet and asked her to compose a poem for him. Madame Huarui immediately sang (as translated by Anthony C. Yu):

References

Sources 
  
 
 
 "Huarui Furen", Mountain Songs, last accessed June 8, 2007

External links 
 Narrating the Death of the Shu State by Huarui Furen

Chinese women poets
Song dynasty poets
Later Shu poets
940 births
976 deaths
Year of birth uncertain
Writers from Chengdu
Five Dynasties and Ten Kingdoms imperial consorts
Later Shu people
Poets from Sichuan
10th-century Chinese poets
10th-century Chinese women
10th-century Chinese people
10th-century Chinese women writers
Chinese concubines